Asbhar may refer to:
 Asbhar-e Olya
 Asbhar-e Sofla